Ghoti railway station is located in Maharashtra, Nashik, Igatpuri. It belongs to Central Railway, Bhusaval Jn . Neighbourhood stations are Igatpuri and Padli. The nearest major railway station is Nasik Road. Its station code is GO.  It has two platforms.

References

External links 

Railway stations in Nashik district
Bhusawal railway division